Sirjan (also Romanized as Sīrjān; formerly Sa‘īdābād) is a city and the capital of Sirjan County, Kerman Province, in the south of Iran. According to the 2016 census, its population was 324,103 in 95,357 families. It is known for its pistachios, Kilim and its wind towers, locally known as Bādgir-e Chopoqi (calumet louver).

Climate 
At , it is situated in a depression between the southern Zagros Mountains to the west and the Kuh-e Bidkhan massif to the east.

Once containing extensive and thick forests, at present the total area of counties forests which are scattered throughout the region in a natural reserved area is around  containing trees and shrubs such as turpentines, conifers and dwarf maples amongst many others.

Culture 
Sirjan is a historic city with culture. There are historical and cultural monuments in the city of Sirjan.

Universities and higher education centers

Payam Noor University Sirjan

University of Technology, Sirjan 
Sirjan University of Technology is a non-profit public higher education institution that was established in 1992. This university, which was established by the Ministry of Science, Research and Technology of Iran, offers courses and programs that lead to obtaining official degrees from higher education. Sirjan University of Technology also provides many university and non-university facilities and services including library and administrative services to students.

Islamic Azad University, Sirjan

Historical sites, ancient artifacts and tourism 
This city was established in the Sasanian era and has several mineral sources including coal, iron, copper, stone and gold.

Today the city is witnessing great economic growth mainly due to its industrial sector as well as its key location in the heart of southern Iran. With established strategic roads for domestic supply of goods as well as great access to Bandar E Abbas for exportation of goods.

Sirjan campus of Kerman University of Medical Sciences is in Sirjan, called Sirjan School of Medical Sciences and is affiliated to Kerman University of Medical Sciences is established in 2010 with more than 500 undergraduate students.

Chopoqi Windcatcher 
The Chopoqi Windcatcher is a historical windcatcher belonging to the Pahlavi dynasty and is located in Sirjan, Kerman Province in Iran.

Tomb of Mire Zobeyr 
The Tomb of Mire Zobeyr is a historical tomb belonging to the Ilkhanate and is located in Sirjan County, Kerman Province in Iran.

Tomb of Shah Firooz 
The Tomb of Shah Firooz is a historical tomb belonging to the ninth century AH and is located in Sirjan, Kerman Province in Iran.

Sang Castle 
Main article: Sang Castle
Sang Castle is a historical castle located in Sirjan County in Kerman Province, The longevity of this fortress dates back to the Sasanian Empire.

Name
The first name of Sirjan was Sirgan or Samangan. For the sake of the Arabs, the change was made in the pronunciation of it. Afterwards, it turned into Sirjan.

Industry

Sirjan has several of the largest companies within its  radius. Gole Gohar Iron Ore Mine is the countries' largest with estimated $2.8 billion valuation. PolyTech of Sirjan Co., with over 400 employees, is the largest domestic manufacturer in the city's Industrial Town. 
Gold Iran under license from LG is also a major player in the city with 1,200 employees and a location in the Special Economic Zone. LG assembles most of its Iranian market digital products in this location.

Transportation
The city is served by the Sirjan Airport . The city also has a railway station near the airport.

Future plan/development

Sirjan Petrochemical Co. is currently gathering its second round of investments in order to establish the first Petrochemical Facility in the Kerman Province.

Mereekh Market (Part of Mereekh Food Ind. Group) plans to develop the first multi-store shopping center in the city's downtown area. The estimated project is reported to cost $20M.

Special Economic Zone, Industrial Town #1, and Industrial Town #2 continue to grow its factory base.

Gallery

References

Sirjan County
Cities in Kerman Province
Populated places in Sirjan County
Sasanian cities